Attiégouakro is a town in central Ivory Coast. Since 2009 it has been the seat of and a sub-prefectures of Attiégouakro Department, Yamoussoukro Autonomous District.

Attiégouakro was a commune until March 2012, when it became one of 1126 communes nationwide that were abolished.

Villages in the sub-prefecture include Labokro and Morokinkro.

Notes

Sub-prefectures of Yamoussoukro
Former communes of Ivory Coast